Sahebrao Sakhojirao Deshmukh was a politician and a member of the Indian National Congress, and son of Sakhojirao Baradkar Deshmukh. He was a four term Member of the Maharashtra Legislative Assembly from the Mudkhed constituency.

He was born in Barad.

Footnotes

Living people
Year of birth missing (living people)
Indian politicians